Vodolija (Cyrillic::Водолија; English translation:Aquarius) is a Macedonian rock band formed in 1989 that officially started in 1991 when they had their first official appearance on Pop-Rock Fest 1991 and recorded the first official single in the studio M2 of the Macedonian Radio Television. They released three studio albums and  participated three times in the Macedonian Eurovision Song Contest 2009 with the song (Mojot TV), Macedonian Eurovision Song Contest 2010 with the song (Solza) and Macedonian Eurovision Song Contest 2011 with the song (Ne vrakaj se). The first two albums of Vodolija were recorded in the studio of Vladimir Petrovski-Karter from Badmingtons. The third album was recorded in Risto Apostolov studio.

In 2008/2009 the frontman of Vodolija Risto Apostolov collaborated with Sonia Sauruk from New Jersey for "Best of your love" and "Summertime". "Summertime" is on their third album. In June 2010 Vodolija  held an acoustic concert on Macedonian Public Television MTV. The concert was broadcast in October 2010. All songs of Vodolija were composed and written by frontman and guitarist Risto Apostolov. In November 2011 they get the prize for best production for "Ti ne si".
 
In August 2013 they participated in Ohrid Fest festival with "Radost i bol" in pop and International night of festival. It was composed by Risto Apostolov. In 2015 Vodolija's "Se sto mi treba" is part of the Where is the money soundtrack and frontman of the band Risto  Apostolov guest starred in the movie.

Discography

Singles
 "Izmislen od Bajki" (2006)
 "Ti ne si" (2007)
 "Sekavanja" (2008)
 "Mojot TV" (2009)
 "Solza" (2010)
 "Ne vrakaj se" (2011)
 "Radost i bol" (2013)
 "Kako od bajki" (2015)
 "Se sto mi treba" (2015)
 "Odam napred" (2015)
 "Koga i kako" (2016)
 "Ljubovna pesna" (2017)
 "Samo eden" (2019)
 "Polna so magija (2020)
 "Strast (2022)

Albums
 Ljubov ili Strasti (1996)
 Hazard (1997)
 Se sto e sveto (2009)

References
Страст 
„Водолија“ со сета сласт се’ уште ви ја нуди старата добра рок ен рол -„Страст“ (ЛИРИК ВИДЕО)
“Страст” е нешто ново од “Водолија” 
„Полна со магија“ е новиот сингл на Водолија! 
„Водолија“ потсетува дека овој живот е – „Само еден“ (ВИДЕО) 
„Само еден“ нова песна на „Водолија“
Рок-групата „Водолија“ го објави спотот за новата „Љубовна песна“ (ВИДЕО)

External links 
Водолија – „Кога и како“ (ВИДЕО) 
„Водолија“ прашуваат „Кога и како?“

Macedonian rock music groups
Macedonian alternative rock groups